Samuel Gregson (1793–1865) was a nineteenth-century British merchant, politician, philanthropist. 

Eldest son of Samuel Gregson (1762–1846), manager of the Lancaster Canal Company, he won a scholarship to Lancaster Royal Grammar School. In London he was Chairman of the East India and China Trading Association and a commodities trader.

After establishing a successful trading business, Gregson inherited land in Lancashire and also Manorial Rights and property in Cheshire through marriage. He predominantly, and his family provided the land and financial resources to construct Christ Church, Lancaster

Gregson was a co-founder of the Natural History Museum.

See also
 The Gregson Centre

References

External links
 ODNB

1793 births
1865 deaths
English biographers
People educated at Lancaster Royal Grammar School
Mayors of Lancaster, Lancashire
Whig (British political party) MPs for English constituencies
Members of the Parliament of the United Kingdom for English constituencies
UK MPs 1847–1852
UK MPs 1852–1857
UK MPs 1857–1859
UK MPs 1859–1865